Little Rock Creek may refer to:

Little Rock Creek (Los Angeles County, California)
Little Rock Creek (Minnesota River), a stream in Minnesota
Little Rock Creek (Mississippi River), a stream in Minnesota
Little Rock Creek (Red Lake), a stream in Minnesota
Little Rock Creek (Montana)